Genoplesium simulans, commonly known as the Blue Mountains midge orchid is a small terrestrial orchid which is endemic to New South Wales, where it mainly occurs in the Blue Mountains. It has a single thin leaf and up to twenty three dark purplish-black flowers which lean downwards.

Description
As with others in the genus, the flowers are inverted so that the labellum is above the column rather than below it. There is a purplish-black, tapered callus in the centre of the labellum and covering about half of its surface. Flowering occurs from January to March.

Taxonomy and naming
The Blue Mountains midge orchid was first formally described in 1991 by David Jones and the description was published in Australian Orchid Research. In 2002, Jones and Mark Clements changed the name to Corunastylis simulans but the change is not accepted by the Australian Plant Census. The specific epithet (simulans) is a Latin word meaning "imitating" or "copying", referring to the similarity of this species to G. morissii.

Distribution and habitat
Genoplesium simulans grows in forest and with mosses in shallow soil over sandstone in the Blue Mountains and south to Mount Keira.

References

simulans
Endemic orchids of Australia
Orchids of New South Wales
Plants described in 1991